The Balochistan University of Engineering and Technology (BUET) is a public university located in Khuzdar, Balochistan, Pakistan.

Programs 
The university offers the following degree programs:
 BE Civil Engineering
 BE Mechanical Engineering
 BE Electrical Engineering
 BE Electronic Engineering
 BE Energy System Engineering
 BE Computer Systems Engineering
 BS Computer Science
 BS Information Technology
 BS Software Engineering
 ME Civil Engineering
 ME Mechanical Engineering
 ME Electrical Engineering
 ME Computer Systems Engineering
 MS Computer Science

See also 
 List of engineering universities and colleges in Pakistan
 List of universities in Pakistan

References

External links 
 BUET official website
 HEC - national digital library - Balochistan University of Engineering and Technology

Educational institutions established in 1987
1987 establishments in Pakistan
Engineering universities and colleges in Pakistan
Public universities and colleges in Balochistan, Pakistan